The Face at the Window is a 1920 British silent crime film directed by Wilfred Noy and starring C. Aubrey Smith, Gladys Jennings and Jack Hobbs It is based on a play of the same name by Brooke Warren first performed in 1897. Its plot concerns a British criminologist who helps the French police to solve a murder in Paris.

Cast
 C. Aubrey Smith - Bentinck 
 Gladys Jennings - Marie de Brisson 
 Jack Hobbs - Lucien Cartwright 
 Charles Quatermaine - Lucien deGradoff 
 Ben Field - Peter Pottlebury 
 Simeon Stuart - Henri de Brisson 
 Kathleen Vaughan - Babbette 
 Kinsey Peile - Doctor le blanc

References

External links

1920 films
1920 crime films
Films directed by Wilfred Noy
British films based on plays
British silent feature films
British black-and-white films
British crime films
1920s English-language films
1920s British films